Homegrown is the fourteenth album by UB40 released on 3 November 2003.  The only single release from this album was "Swing Low", which was used as the Official Theme for the 2003 Rugby World Cup.

Track listing
All tracks composed by UB40; except where indicated
"So Destructive"
"I Knew You"
"Drop on By"
"Someone Like Me"
"Freestyler"
"Everything Is Better Now"
"Just Be Good" (Bushman Dub)
"Young Guns"
"Hand That Rocks The Cradle"
"Nothing Without You"
"Nothing Without You" (Dub)
"Swing Low" (Traditional, Charlie Skarbek) featuring United Colours of Sound (Bonus Track)

References

UB40 albums
2003 albums